The Syed Modi International Badminton Championships is an international badminton tournament, which is held annually in India.

This tournament was introduced to the badminton circuit as a BWF Grand Prix event in 2009. Since then the tournament is being annually held in Lucknow at the Babu Banarasi Das Indoor Stadium, although it was temporarily shifted to Hyderabad in 2010. In 2011, it was upgraded to the Grand Prix Gold event. Badminton World Federation launched a new event structure in 2017. This tournament was later included as a BWF World Tour Super 300 event which began to be competed in 2018.

History
The tournament was inaugurated by Uttar Pradesh Badminton Association (UPBA) in 1991 as the 'Syed Modi Memorial Badminton Tournament' in memory of the Commonwealth Games champion Syed Modi.

From its inauguration till 2003, it remained a national-level tournament. In 2004, it was organized as an International event for the first time, which saw some low-key foreign participation.

The tournament was halted from 2005 to 2008 due to a political impasse between the UPBA and the Government of Uttar Pradesh, which ended with relocation of the Uttar Pradesh Badminton Academy.

Winners

Performances by nation

See also
India Open
Hyderabad Open (badminton)
Odisha Open
India International Challenge

References

 
Badminton tournaments in India